Tomáš Macháč was the defending champion but chose not to defend his title.

Roman Safiullin won the title after defeating Vasek Pospisil 6–2, 7–5 in the final.

Seeds

Draw

Finals

Top half

Bottom half

References

External links
Main draw
Qualifying draw

Koblenz Open - 1
2023 Singles